A bicycle-sharing system, bike share program, public bicycle scheme, or public bike share (PBS) scheme, is a shared transport service where bicycles are available for shared use by individuals at low cost.

The programmes themselves include both docking and dockless systems, where docking systems allow users to rent a bike from a dock, i.e., a technology-enabled bicycle rack and return at another node or dock within the system — and dockless systems, which offer a node-free system relying on smart technology. In either format, systems may incorporate smartphone web mapping to locate available bikes and docks. In July 2020, Google Maps began including bike share systems in its route recommendations.

With its antecedents in grassroots mid-1960s efforts; by 2022, approximately 3,000 cities worldwide offer bike-sharing systems, e.g., Dubai, New York, Paris, Montreal and Barcelona.

History 

The first bike sharing projects were initiated by various sources, such as local community organizations, charitable projects intended for the disadvantaged, as way to promote bicycles as a non-polluting form of transportation — and bike-lease businesses.

The earliest well-known community bicycle program was started in the summer of 1965 by Luud Schimmelpennink in association with the group Provo in Amsterdam, the Netherlands. the group Provo painted fifty bicycles white and placed them unlocked in Amsterdam for everyone to use freely. 
This so-called White Bicycle Plan provided free bicycles that were supposed to be used for one trip and then left for someone else. Within a month, most of the bikes had been stolen and the rest were found in nearby canals. The program is still active in some parts of the Netherlands, e.g., at Hoge Veluwe National Park where bikes may be used within the park. It originally existed as one in a series of White Plans proposed in the street magazine produced by the anarchist group PROVO. Years later, Schimmelpennink admitted that "the Sixties experiment never existed in the way people believe" and that "no more than about ten bikes" had been put out on the street "as a suggestion of the bigger idea." As the police had temporarily confiscated all of the White Bicycles within a day of their release to the public, the White Bicycle experiment had actually lasted less than one month.

Ernest Callenbach's novel Ecotopia (1975) illustrated the idea. In the utopian novel of a society that does not use fossil fuels, Callenbach described a bicycle sharing system which is available to inhabitants and is an integrated part of the public transportation system.

To prevent thefts, bike sharing programs gravitated to smart card control systems.' One of the first 'smart bike' programs was the Grippa™ bike storage rack system used in Portsmouth (UK)'s Bikeabout system. The Bikeabout scheme was launched in October 1995 by the University of Portsmouth, UK as part of its Green Transport Plan in an effort to cut car travel by staff and students between campus sites. Funded in part by the EU's ENTRANCE program, the Bikeabout scheme was a "smart card" fully automated system. For a small fee, users were issued magnetic striped 'smart cards' readable at a covered 'bike store' kiosk, unlocking the bike from its storage rack, station-located CCTV cameras limited vandalism. On arrival at the destination station, the smart card unlocked cycle rack and recorded the bike's return, registering if the bike was returned with damage or if the rental time exceeded a three-hour maximum. Implemented with an original budget of approximately £200,000, the Portsmouth Bikeabout scheme was never very successful in terms of rider usage, in part due to the limited number of bike kiosks and hours of operation. Seasonal weather restrictions and concerns over unjustified charges for bike damage also imposed barriers to usage. The Bikeabout program was discontinued by the university in 1998 in favor of expanded minibus service; the total costs of the Bikeabout program were never disclosed.

One of the first community bicycle projects in the United States was started in Portland, Oregon in 1994 by civic and environmental activists Tom O'Keefe, Joe Keating and Steve Gunther. It took the approach of simply releasing a number of bicycles to the streets for unrestricted use. While Portland's Yellow Bike Project was successful in terms of publicity, it proved unsustainable due to theft and vandalism of the bicycles. The Yellow Bike Project was eventually terminated, and replaced with the Create A Commuter (CAC) program, which provides free secondhand bicycles to certain preselected low-income and disadvantaged people who need a bicycle to get to work or attend job training courses.

In 1995, a system of 300 bicycles using coins to unlock the bicycles in the style of shopping carts was introduced in Copenhagen.  It was initiated by Morten Sadolin and Ole Wessung. The idea was developed by both Copenhageners after they were victims of bicycle theft one night in 1989. Copenhagen's ByCylken program was the first large-scale urban bike share program to feature specially designed bikes with parts that could not be used on other bikes. To obtain a bicycle, riders pay a refundable deposit at one of 100 special locking bike stands, and have unlimited use of the bike within a specified 'city bike zone.' The fine for not returning a bicycle or leaving the bike sharing zone exceeds US$150, and is strictly enforced by the Copenhagen police. Originally, the program's founders hoped to completely finance the program by selling advertising space on the bicycles, which was placed on the bike's frame and its solid disc-type wheels. This funding source quickly proved to be insufficient, and the city of Copenhagen took over the administration of the program, funding most of the program costs through appropriations from city revenues along with contributions from corporate donors. Since the City Bikes program is free to the user, there is no return on the capital invested by the municipality, and a considerable amount of public funds must constantly be re-invested to keep the system in service, to enforce regulations, and to replace missing bikes.

The modern wave of electronically locked bikes available via a credit card for short trips was largely pioneered by the BIXI project (from "bycyle taxi") launched by the City of Montreal in 2009. It garnered a sizable ridership and the city created the Public Bike System Company to begin selling the underlying infrastructure to several other cities, including Washington D.C.'s Capital Bikeshare (2010), New York City's Citi Bike (2013), and London's "Boris bikes (2010)".  The PBSC was privatised in 2014 and was later acquired by Lyft in 2022.  Separately in 2018, Lyft had acquired Motivate, an operator of many BIXI-based systems.  Meanwhile, the original BIXI system has been operated directly by the City of Montreal since 2014.

In 2016, the Portland Bureau of Transportation (PBOT) launched Biketown, also known as Biketown PDX, a bicycle-sharing system in Portland, Oregon. It is operated by Motivate, with Nike, Inc. as the title sponsor. At launch, the system had 100 stations and 1,000 bicycles serving the city's central and eastside neighbourhoods, with hopes to expand outward.

Bike share technology has evolved over the course of decades, and development of programs in Asia has grown exponentially. Of the world's 15 biggest public bike share programs, 13 are in China. In 2012, the biggest are in Wuhan and Hangzhou, with around 90,000 and 60,000 bikes respectively.

As of December 2016, roughly 1,000 cities worldwide have a bike-sharing program.

Categorization
Bike-sharing systems have developed and evolved with society changes and technological improvements. The systems can be grouped into five categories or generations. 
Many bicycle programmes paint their bicycles in a strong solid colour, such as yellow or white. Painting the bicycles helps to advertise the programme, as well as deter theft (a painted-over bicycle frame is normally less desirable to a buyer). However, theft rates in many bike-sharing programmes remain high, as most shared-use bicycles have value only as basic transport, and may be resold to unsuspecting buyers after being cleaned and repainted. In response, some large-scale bike sharing programmes have designed their own bike using specialized frame designs and other parts to prevent disassembly and resale of stolen parts.

Staffed stations 

 Short-term checkout

Also known as bicycle rental, bike hire or zero generation. In this system a bicycle can be rented or borrowed from a location and returned to that location. These bicycle renting systems often cater to day-trippers or tourists.  This system is also used by cycling schools for potential cyclists who don't have a bicycle.  The locations or stations are not automated but are run by employees or volunteers.

Regional programs have been implemented where numerous renting locations are set up at railway stations and at local businesses (usually restaurants, museums and hotels) creating a network of locations where bicycles can be borrowed from and returned (e.g. ZweiRad FreiRad with at times 50 locations).  In this kind of network for example a railway station master can allocate a bicycle to a user that then returns it at a different location, for example a hotel.  Some such systems require paying a fee, and some do not.  Usually the user will be registered or a deposit will be left by the renting facility.  The EnCicla Bike Share System in Medellín on its inception in 2011 had 6 staffed locations.  It later grew to 32 automatic and 19 staffed stations making it a hybrid between a zero generation and third generation system.

Long-term checkout

Sometimes known as bike library systems, these bicycles may be lent free of charge, for a refundable deposit, or for a small fee.  A bicycle is checked out to one person who will typically keep it for several months, and is encouraged or obliged to lock it between uses.  A disadvantage is a lower usage frequency, around three uses per day on average as compared to 2 to 15 uses per day typically experienced with other bike-sharing schemes.  Advantages of long-term use include rider familiarity with the bicycle, and constant, instant readiness.

The bicycle can be checked out like a library book, a liability waiver can be collected at check-out, and the bike can be returned any time.  For each trip, a Library Bike user can choose the bike instead of a car, thus lowering car usage.  The long-term rental system generally results in fewer repair costs to the scheme administrator, as riders are incentivised to obtain minor maintenance in order to keep the bike in running order during the long rental period.  Most of the long-term systems implemented to date are funded solely through charitable donations of second-hand bicycles, using unpaid volunteer labour to maintain and administer the bicycle fleet.  While reducing or eliminating the need for public funding, such a scheme imposes an outer limit to program expansion.  The Arcata Bike Library, in California, has loaned over 4000 bicycles using this system.

White bikes

Also known as free bikes, unregulated or first generation. In this type of programme the bicycles are simply released into a city or given area for use by anyone. In some cases, such as a university campus, the bicycles are only designated for use within certain boundaries. Users are expected to leave the bike unlocked in a public area once they reach their destination. Depending on the quantity of bicycles in the system availability of such bicycles can suffer because the bikes are not required to be returned to a centralised station. Such a system can also suffer under distribution problems where many bicycles end up in a valley of a city but few are found on the hills of a city.  Since parked and unlocked bikes may be taken by another user at any time, the original rider might have to find an alternative transport for the return trip. This system does away with the cost of having a person allocating a vehicle to a user and it is the system with the lowest hemmschwelle or psychological barrier for a potential user. However, bicycle sharing programs without locks, user identification, and security deposits have also historically suffered loss rates from theft and vandalism. Many initiatives have been abandoned after a few years (e.g. Portland's Yellow Bike Project was abandoned after 3 years), while others have been successful for decades (e.g. Austin's Yellow Bike Project active since 1997). Most of these systems are based around volunteer work and are supported by municipalities. Bicycle repair and maintenance are done by a volunteer project or from the municipality contracted operator but also can be, and sometimes is, completed by individual users who find a defect on a free bike.

Coin deposit stations

Also known as Bycykel or as second generation, this system was developed by Morten Sadolin and Ole Wessung of Copenhagen after both were victims of bicycle theft one night in 1989. They envisioned a freely available bicycle sharing system that would encourage spontaneous usage and also reduce bicycle theft.  The bicycles, designed for intense utilitarian use with solid rubber tires and wheels with advertising plates, have a slot into which a shopping cart return key can be pushed. A coin (in most versions a 20 DKK or 2 EUR coin) needs to be pushed into the slot to unlock the bike from the station. The bicycle can thus be borrowed free of charge and for an unlimited time and the deposit coin can be retrieved by returning the bicycle to a station again. Since the deposit is a fraction of the bike's cost, and user is not registered this can be vulnerable to theft and vandalism. However, the distinct Bycykel design, well known to the public and to the law authorities does deter misuse to a degree. Implemented systems usually have a zone or area where it is allowed to drive in.  The first coin deposit (small) systems were launched in 1991 in Farsø and Grenå, Denmark, and in 1993 in Nakskov, Denmark with 26 bikes and 4 stations. In 1995 the first large-scale 800 bike strong second generation bike-sharing program was launched in Copenhagen as Bycyklen. The system was further introduced in Helsinki (2000-2010) and Vienna in (2002) and in Aarhus 2003.

Automated stations

Also known as docking stations bicycle-sharing, or membership bicycles or third generation consist of bicycles that can be borrowed or rented from an automated station or "docking stations" or "docks" and can be returned at another station belonging to the same system. The docking stations are special bike racks that lock the bike, and only release it by computer control. Individuals registered with the program identify themselves with their membership card (or by a smart card, via cell phone, or other methods) at any of the hubs to check out a bicycle for a short period of time, usually three hours or less. In many schemes the first half-hour is free. In recent years, in an effort to reduce losses from theft and vandalism, many bike-sharing schemes now require a user to provide a monetary deposit or other security, or to become a paid subscriber. The individual is responsible for any damage or loss until the bike is returned to another hub and checked in.

Some cities allow to use the same card as for bus and rail transport to unlocks the bycicles.

This system was developed as Public Velo by Hellmut Slachta and Paul Brandstätter from 1990 to 1992, and first implemented in 1996 by the University of Portsmouth and Portsmouth City Council as Bikeabout with a magnetic card used by the students and on 6 June 1998 in Rennes as LE vélo STAR, a public city network with 200 bikes, 25 stations and electronic identification of the bikes or in Oslo in 2001. The smart card contactless technology was experimented in Vienna (Citybike Wien) and implemented at a large scale in 2005 in Lyon (Vélo'v) and in 2007 in Paris (Vélib'). Since then over 1000 bicycle sharing system of this generation have been launched. The countries with the most dock based systems are Spain (132), Italy (104), and China (79). , public bike share systems were available in 50 countries on five continents, including 712 cities, operating approximately 806,200 bicycles at 37,500 stations. , the Wuhan and Hangzhou Public Bicycle bike-share systems in China were the largest in the world, with around 90,000 and 60,000 bicycles respectively. By 2013, China had a combined fleet of 650,000 public bikes.

This bicycle-sharing system saves the labour costs of staffed stations (zero generation), reduces vandalism and theft compared to first and second generation systems by registering users but requires a higher investment for infrastructure compared to fourth generation dockless bikes.  Third generation systems also allow adapting docking stations as recharging stations for E-bike sharing.

Dockless bikes

Also known as Call a Bike, free floating bike or fourth generation, the dockless bike hire systems consist of a bicycle with a lock that is usually integrated onto the frame and does not require a docking station. The earliest versions of this system consisted of for-rent-bicycles that were locked with combination locks and that could be unlocked by a registered user by calling the vendor to receive the combination to unlock the bicycle. The user would then call the vendor a second time to communicate where the bicycle had been parked and locked.  This system was further developed by Deutsche Bahn in 1998 to incorporate a digital authentication codes (that changes) to automatically lock and unlock bikes. Deutsche Bahn launched Call a Bike in 2000, enabling users to unlock via SMS or telephone call, and more recently with an app. Recent technological and operational improvements by telephones and GPSs have paved the way for dramatic increase of this type of private app driven "dockless" bicycle-sharing system. In particular in China, Ofo and Mobike have become the world's largest bike share operators with millions of bikes spread over 100 cities. Today dockless bike shares are designed whereby a user need not return the bike to a kiosk or station; rather, the next user can find it by GPS. Over 30 private companies have started operating in China. However, the rapid growth vastly outpaced immediate demand and overwhelmed Chinese cities, where infrastructure and regulations were not prepared to handle a sudden flood of millions of shared bicycles.

Not needing docking stations that may require city planning and building permissions, the system spread rapidly on a global scale,.  At times dockless bike-sharing systems have been criticized as rogue systems instituted without respect for local authorities.  In many cities entrepreneurial companies have independently introduced this system, despite a lack of adequate parking facilities.  City officials lack regulation experience for this mode of transportation and social habits have not developed either.  In some jurisdictions, authorities have confiscated "rogue" dockless bicycles that are improperly parked for potentially blocking pedestrian traffic on sidewalks and in other cases new laws have been introduced to regulate the shared bikes.

In some cities Deutsche Bahn's Call a Bike has Call a Bike fix system, which has fixed docking stations versus the flex dockless version, some systems are combined into a hybrid of third and fourth generation systems. Some Nextbike systems are also a 3rd and 4th generation hybrid.
With the arrival of dockless bike shares, there were in 2017 over 70 private dockless bikeshares operating a combined fleet of 16 million sharebikes according to estimates of Ministry of Transport of China. Beijing alone has 2.35 million sharebikes from 15 companies.

In the United States, many major metropolitan areas are experimenting with dockless bikeshare systems, which have been popular with commuters but subject to complaints about illegal parking.

Goals 
People use bike-share for various reasons.  Some who would otherwise use their own bicycle have concerns about theft or vandalism, parking or storage, and maintenance.

Provide Sustainable Alternative for Short-Distance Trip 

Most large-scale urban bike sharing programmes have numerous bike check-out stations, and operate much like public transit systems, catering to tourists and visitors as well as local residents. Their central concept is to provide free or affordable access to bicycles for short-distance trips in an urban area as an alternative to private vehicles, thereby reducing congestion, noise, and air pollution. According to research in 2016, bike sharing system in Shanghai saved 8,358 tonnes of petrol and decreased Carbon dioxide and NOx emissions by 25,240 and 64 tonnes, respectively. The research also stated that bike sharing system has great potential to reduce energy consumption and emissions based on its rapid development.

Solve Last Mile problem 
Bicycle-sharing systems have also been cited as a way to solve the "last mile" problem of public transit networks.  According to a research conducted on Youbike system in Taipei City, on 2014, the bike sharing system in residential area are more popular, and as a first/last mile of transport mode to and from the station to their desired locations. However, dock systems, serving only stations, resemble public transit, and have therefore been criticized as less convenient than a privately owned bicycle used door-to-door.

Operation

Bicycle-sharing systems are an economic good, and are generally classified as a private good due to their excludable and rivalrous nature. While some bicycle-sharing systems are free, most require some user fee or subscription, thus excluding the good to paying consumers. Bicycle-sharing systems also provide a discrete and limited number of bikes, whose distribution can vary throughout a city. One person's usage of the good diminishes the ability of others to use the same good. Nonetheless, the hope of many cities is to partner with bike-share companies to provide something close to a public good. Public good status may be achieved if the service is free to consumers and there are a sufficient number of bicycles such that one person's usage does not encroach upon another's use of the good.

Partnership with public transport sector
In a national-level programme that combines a typical rental system with several of the above system types, a passenger railway operator or infrastructure manager partners with a national cycling organisation and others to create a system closely connected with public transport. These programmes usually allow for a longer rental time of up to 24 or 48 hours, as well as tourists and round trips. In some German cities the national rail company offers a bike rental service called Call a Bike.

In Guangzhou, China, the privately operated Guangzhou Bus Rapid Transit system includes cycle lanes, and a public bicycle system.

In some cases, like Santander Cycles in London, the bicycle sharing system is owned by the public transport authority itself.

In other cases, like Youbike in Taipei, Taiwan, the bicycle sharing system is built by a private company partner with the public transport sector through BOT mode. To be more specific in this case, it is offered by the Taipei City Department of Transportation in a BOT collaboration with local manufacturer Giant Bicycles.

Partnership with other public transports 
In many cities over the world, bike sharing system is connected to other public transportation. It is usually hoped to complement the shortcomings in the greater public transport system. Sometimes, in order to encourage residents to use public transport system, local government will give discount on transferring between bike sharing system and other public transports.

Medellin 

The city of Medellin is home to 3.4 million inhabitants in 173 km2 and has long faced infrastructural mobility challenges. EnCicla is a bike sharing system in the city of Medellin (Colombia, South America). The bike sharing system is connected to other modes of transportation, such as the Metro.

In 2010, three EAFIT students (Lina Marcela López, José Agusto Ocampo, and Felipe Gutiérrez) developed the idea of the EnCicla bike sharing system as part of their final project. The implementation of the system was decided in operation in August 2012, with the subsequent pilot program confirming its prospects for success. EAFIT advocated for the city to lead the system. This was implemented accordingly, resulting in the inclusion of EnCicla in the agenda of the city of Medellin and its incorporation into the transportation network. In this regard, EnCicla consists of a mixture of shared, as well as separated, bike lanes on the roadway. In the first 3 months after the official launch, 15,700 bicycle rentals took place, with usage picking up sharply in subsequent months and years.  In Medellin, an attempt was made to solve the demand problem with statistical analysis using historical data. The result of this analysis was the establishment of a heterogeneous bicycle fleet, with a minimum and maximum number for each station.

In total, in Medellin there exist more than 90 stations in 7 zones, with 13 connected to other transport systems. Since inception, more than 13 million bicycles have been rented by the approximately 9,100 active members. In this context, the most frequently used stations are located in the western zone, near universities and colleges. These stations are located near train stations, which means that there is a high volume of people. To use EnCicla, citizens must register on the official website.  In general, the system can be used free of charge by anyone 16 years of age or older and is available from 5:30-22:00 during the week and from 6:30- 21:00 on Saturdays.  Local residents must register through Encicla's website prior to use, and tourists have the option of renting a bicycle using their passport.

The establishment of EnCicla in recent years has helped relieve the complex transportation system in Medelin. However, the repositioning of bicycles at stations results in increased CO2 emissions, which run counter to the environmental importance of the project. In parallel, various activities have been carried out to promote the establishment of the system. These include a program that gives people over 8 years of age the opportunity to improve their knowledge and skills in cycling.

Taipei Metropolitan Area 

YouBike, a bike sharing system in Taipei–Keelung metropolitan area, Taiwan, has automated stations near all Taipei Metro stations. The integration of YouBike stations and Taipei Metro aims at solving the "last mile" problem, thus improving transit accessibility and usability. It is hoped that YouBike could complement the shortcomings in the greater public transport. Commuters can check in or check out YouBikes near the metro stations to catch connections from the station to the destination.

Transfer Discount Offered for Commuters 
Starting 30 March 2021, passengers renting a YouBike from any YouBike station in the Taipei–Keelung metropolitan area receive a discount of NT$5 when using their EasyCard to transfer between YouBike and Taipei Metro, local buses (except buses that charge by distance) or Danhai LRT within one hour. Plus, the trip is only eligible for a discount when the transfer is direct. Commuters shall not utilise other means of transportation, such as Taiwan Railways, Maokong Gondola, long-distance buses, Taiwan High Speed Rail, Taoyuan Metro, or taxis.

Transfer Behavior 
According to the analysis of YouBike rental and its Taipei MRT (Taipei Rapid Transit System) transfer behavior from the Department of Transportation, New Taipei City Government, YouBike has already become an important feeder mode for metro commuters: up to 55% of the subjects (the commuters who ever utilise YouBike during September, 2015) transfer by YouBike before or after taking the Metro. Adopting the YouBike and MRT transaction data of EasyCard in New Taipei City in November, 2016, almost all popular YouBike stations can be found next to the Taipei metro stations. Furthermore, transfer analysis depending on the YouBike and MRT data indicates that, the transfer ratio of loyal users (who utilise YouBike more than five times per week) is up to 60%.

Seoul Metropolitan Area 
Sharing bicycles in South Korea are called 'Ddareungi' in Seoul capital area. Ddareungi is a sharing bicycle operated throughout Seoul. It is an unmanned sharing bicycle rental service that started pilot operation in 2014 and officially operated in October 2015.

The 1-hour pass for Ddareungi is KRW 1000(Approximate 1 USD), and to prevent theft, an additional charge of KRW 1000 per 30 minutes is charged for exceeding the usage time.

Transit Mileage 
Transit Mileage is a benefit that can only be received by 365-day commuter pass users. If you use public transportation within 30 minutes of returning the bicycle, the mileage is accumulated. If it is difficult to travel by bus or subway, the section can be replaced with Ddareungi.

Bicycle Driving Ability Certification System Fee Benefits 
Bicycle driving ability certification system requires completion of bicycle safety education, if you pass both the written and practical exams, it will receive certification and part of the Ddareungi usage fee can be reduced for two years.

QR Code Lock 
From March 1, 2020, QR Code Lock was introduced as a method of renting and returning by recognizing QR codes. It is convenient because it can be rented or returned with a single scan by using a QR code-type locking device. When renting a bicycle, purchase a voucher from the bicycle app and scan the QR code on the bicycle to rent, and the lock is automatically unlocked and can be used immediately. It can return and rent a bicycle anywhere without going to a bicycle rental booth.

Sprout Ddareungyi 
Existing sharing bicycles can only be used by those over the age of 15, so Sprout Ddareungyi, which can be rented from the age of 13 and older, has been launched in Seoul. The government released a policy for public bicycles with reduced size and weight compared to the existing Ddareungi bicycles so that even small-sized people, such as teenagers and the elderly, could use them conveniently.

The number of users of Seoul's public bicycle 'Ddareungi' has exceeded 3 million. It is used by about one in three Seoul citizens. General citizens have a high rate of use during commuting hours on weekdays, except on weekends, so after using public transportation such as Seoul Metropolitan Subway as well as Seoul Buses, when it is an ambiguous distance to use public transportation anymore, citizens use public bicycles near subway stations to move the most. In particular, considering that rentals and returns are made at rental stations near subway stations, citizens frequently use Ddareungi that are deployed in subway stations. To analyse, if the number of cases is classified based on the number of Ddareungi rental stations near subway stations in 2021, exit 1 of the Ttukseom Park area of Hangang Park, which is the most used in Seoul, is the first with 602 rentals, After that, Express Bus Terminal Station and Lotte World Tower's Jamsil Station Exit 2 followed. It is analysed that the most frequently used Ttukseom area, exit 1, is usually used by citizens who enjoy leisure at Hangang Park except during rush hour.

Hamburg 
The bicycle sharing system "StadtRAD" of Hamburg (Germany) was launched in 2009 and now includes 3,100 bicycles and 20 cargo bikes. The infrastructure includes 250 fixed stations distributed throughout the city. With the help of the app, it is possible to rent up to two bikes. For an annual fee of €5, the first 30 minutes of each rental are free. A total of 500,000 people are registered with the app.

"StadtRAD" is an integral part of the city's mobility transition. The aim here is to reduce motorized private transport by strengthening Public transport, making it easier to switch between different modes of transport and developing the city into a bicycle city. To achieve this, the share of cyclists in total traffic should increase to 25%.

The administrative responsibility for implementing the mobility strategy is assumed by the Alliance for Cycling, which is assigned to the Authority for Transport and Mobility Change. Its task is to make the transport infrastructure bicycle-friendly by promoting the construction of bike and ride facilities, making subway stops barrier-friendly and expanding bicycle routes. In addition, it should be made easier to take bicycles on buses and trains, and traffic safety should be strengthened through traffic education in schools. Another focus is on the interconnection of the different mobility offers through the Switchh app. Citizens can switch between Carsharing, Motorized scooter or offers from the HVV by making reservations or bookings. The integration of "StadtRAD" is planned to take place in 2022.

For the practical implementation of the bicycle sharing system Stadtrad, the city has contracted "Deutsche Bahn Connect". Deutsche Bahn Connect is committed to setting up and operating a public bike sharing system with fixed rental stations within the city boundaries.

In a study conducted by the University of Hamburg, users state that they use the Stadtrad mainly for leisure (55.9%) and regularly spend time in the city center (89.9%). The frequency of use is several times a month (24.9%) and several times a half year (24.9%). In addition, the study shows that the city bike has a positive image among users, they are largely satisfied with the service and recognize environmental and health benefits.  Another study by the authors shows that implementing a green public service increases both perceived social and environmental value. Perceived social and environmental values have a positive influence on the user's green attitude and intentions.

At the same time, however, the need for a reporting system for sharing systems is emphasized, which ideally should be standardized and comparable with other regions. Especially for outsourced projects, monitoring and control processes must be implemented to ensure consistent quality. In addition to the environmental benefits, financial and time constraints must also be considered in large urban planning projects. Hamburg has had increasing spending on bicycle infrastructure since 2011 and spent 15 million euros on it in 2017.

Partnership with car park operators 
Some car park operators such as Vinci Park in France lend bikes to their customers who park a car.

Partnership with car-share operations
City CarShare, a San Francisco-based non-profit, received a federal grant in 2012 to integrate electric bicycles within its existing car-sharing fleet. The program is set to launch before the end of 2012 with 45 bikes.

Financing
The financing of bicycle-sharing system have been maintained by a combination of fees, volunteer, charity, advertisements, business interest groups and government subsidies. The international expansion dockless bicycles in mid 2010s has been financed by investment capital.

User fees
User rent fees may range from the equivalent of US$0.50 to 30.00 per day, rent fees for 15- or 20-minute intervals can range from a few cents to 1.00. Many bike-share systems offer subscriptions that make the first 30–45 minutes of use either free or very inexpensive, encouraging use as transportation. This allows each bike to serve several users per day but reduces revenue.
Monthly or yearly membership subscriptions and initial registration fees may apply. 
To reduce losses from theft often users are required to commit to temporary deposit via a credit card or debit card. If the bike is not returned within the subscription period, or returned with significant damage, the bike sharing operator keeps the deposit or withdraws money from the user's credit card account. operated by private companies as is the case in most cities in China.

US

New York rental rates are among the highest in the world, as of the Citi Bike program's launch in July 2012, but this is of course subject to change. The cost of annual membership in the US varies between $100 and about $170.

Europe

Bike riders shared in Europe usually pay between €0.50 to €1 per trip, and an average of €10–12 for a full day cycling.

Volunteer work
Many first and second generation bicycle sharing programs were and are community run organisations as "Community Bike programmes", as done in IIT Bombay. Often maintenance and repair is performed by unpaid volunteers that complete this work in their own free time.

Charity sources
Charity fundraising drives and charitable organisations have and do support bicycle sharing programs, including Rotary Clubs and Lions Clubs.

Advertisement revenue
Second and third generation schemes in the 90s already prominently included advertising opportunities on the individual bikes in form of advertisement areas on the wheels or frame. Other schemes are completely branded according to a sponsor, notable example London's bike share which was originally branded and sponsored by Barclays Bank and subsequently by Santander UK
Several European cities, including the French cities of Lyon and Paris as well as London, Barcelona, Stockholm and Oslo, have signed contracts with private advertising agencies (JCDecaux in Brussels, Lyon, Paris, Seville, Dublin and Oslo; Clear Channel in Stockholm, Barcelona, Antwerp, Perpignan and Zaragoza) which supply the city with thousands of bicycles free of charge (or for a minor fee). In return, the agencies are allowed to advertise both on the bikes themselves and in other select locations in the city.
typically in the form of advertising on stations or the bicycles themselves.

Government subsidies

Municipalities have operated and do operate bicycle share systems as a public service, paying for the initial investment, maintenance and operations if it is not covered by other revenue sources. Governments can also support bicycle share programs in forms of one time grants (often to buy a set of bicycles), yearly of monthly subsidies, or by paying part of the employee wages (example in repair workshops that employee long-term unemployed persons). Many of the membership-based systems are operated through public-private partnerships. Some schemes may be financed as a part of the public transportation system (for example Smoove). In Melbourne the government subsidises the sale of bicycle helmets to enable spontaneous cyclists comply with the mandatory helmet laws.

Harvesting of user-data
GPS traceable vehicle commute patterns and usage habits present valuable data for government agencies, marketing companies or researchers. Strong commuter patterns can be filtered out and potential transportation services (e.g. commuter bus) can be tailored to existing demand. Potential audiences can be better assessed and understood.

Usage patterns

Most bike-sharing systems allow the bicycles to be returned to any station in the system, which facilitates one-way trips because the users do not need to return the bicycles to the origin.  Thus, one bike may take 10–15 rides a day with different users and can be ridden up to  a year (as in Vélo'v in Lyon, France).  Each bike has at least one rides with one unique user per day which indicates that in 2014 there were a minimum of at least 294 million unique bike share cyclists worldwide (806,200 bicycles x 365) although some estimates are much.

It was found—in cities like Paris and Copenhagen—that to have a major impact there had to be a high density of available bikes. Copenhagen has 2500 bikes which cannot be used outside the  zone of the city centre (a fine of DKK 1000 applies to any user taking bikes across the canal bridges around the periphery). Since Paris's Vélib' programme operates with an increasing fee past the free first half-hour, users have a strong disincentive to take the bicycles out of the city centre.  The distance between stations is only  in inner city areas.
in US, male users of bike sharing made up for more than 80% of total trips made in 2017.

A study published in 2015 in the journal Transportation concludes that bike sharing systems can be grouped into behaviourally similar categories based upon their size.  Cluster analysis shows that larger systems have different usage patterns in different stations, whilst in smaller systems the different stations have similar daily utilization patterns.

Global distribution of bike-sharing systems

Economic impact 
Bike-share programs generate a number of economic externalities, both positive and negative. The positive externalities include reduction of traffic congestion and pollution, while the negative externalities can include degradation of urban aesthetic environment and reduction of parking. Furthermore, bike-share programs have pecuniary effects. Some of these economic externalities (e.g. reduced congestion) can be systematically evaluated using empirical data, and therefore may be internalized through government subsidy. On the other hand, "nuisance" externalities (e.g. street and sidewalk clutter) are more subjective and harder to quantify, and may not be able to be internalized.

Positive effects

Less traffic congestion 
A primary goal of bicycle-sharing systems has been to reduce traffic congestion, particularly in large urban areas. Some empirical evidence indicates that this goal has been achieved to varying degrees in different cities. A 2015 article in Transport Reviews examined bike-share systems in five cities, including Washington, D.C. and Minneapolis. The article found that in D.C., individuals substituted bike-share rides for automobile trips 8 percent of the time, and almost 20 percent of the time in Minneapolis. A separate study on Washington, D.C.'s Capital Bikeshare found that the bike-share program contributed a 2 to 3 percent reduction in traffic congestion within the evaluated neighborhood. 2017 studies in Beijing and Shanghai have linked the massive increase of dockless bike shares to the decrease in the number of private automobile trips that are less than five kilometres. In Guangzhou, the arrival of dockless bike shares had a positive impact in the growth of cycling modeshare.

Less pollution 
Not only do bike-share systems intend to reduce traffic congestion, they also aim to reduce air pollution through decreased automobile usage, and indirectly through the reduction of congestion. The study on D.C.'s Capital Bikeshare estimated that the reduction in traffic congestion would be equivalent to roughly $1.28 million in annual benefits, accrued through the reduction in congestion-induced CO2 emissions. A separate study of transportation in Australia estimated that 1.5 kilograms of CO2 equivalent emissions are avoided by an urban resident who travels 5 kilometers by cycling rather than by car during rush hour periods.

Healthy transport

Bicycle-sharing systems have been shown to have a strong net positive health effect. Cycling is a good way for exercise and stress relief. It can increase recreation and improve sociability of a city, which make people live more happy and relaxed. The report from Centers for Disease Control and Prevention (CDC) point out that cycling also help preventing disease like obesity, heart disease (can reduce up to 82%) and diabetes (can reduce up to 58%). Therefore, bicycle-sharing systems has a positive effect on mental and physical health, which attract more people to use. (Demand increase)

Reduced car parking 
Bike-share programs, especially the earlier services that required docking areas along urban streets, may encroach upon the space available for on-street car parking and other auto-centric uses. While some argue that this is a negative, it is generally considered a positive side effect, since it helps further the transition away from car-dependency.

Negative effects

Urban clutter 
In some cities, the many dockless bike-share bicycles have cluttered streets and sidewalks, degrading the urban aesthetic environment and blocking pedestrian traffic.  In particular, cycles on Chinese city streets have created sections of clogged sidewalks no longer walkable, and piles of illegally parked bicycles.
 Due to the vehicles being left in the public right of way, or abandoned obstructing pedestrians, the dockless vehicles have been called "litter bikes".

Dockless cycles left randomly on public footpaths may impede access for wheelchair users and others who use mobility aids, and may be dangerous to people with visual impairments.

Pecuniary effects 
As bicycle-sharing systems continue to grow and provide an affordable alternative for commuters, the relatively low price of these services may induce competitors to offer lower prices. For instance, municipal public transit organizations may lower prices for buses or subways to continue to compete with bike-share systems. Pecuniary effects may even extend to bicycle manufacturers and retailers, where these producers might reduce prices of bicycles and other complementary goods (e.g. helmets, lights). However, empirical research is needed to test these hypotheses.

Internalization of externalities

Public-private partnerships 
In public economics, there is a role for government intervention in a market if market failures exist, or in the case of redistribution. As several studies have found, bike-share programs appear to produce net positive externalities in reduced traffic congestion and pollution, for example. The bike-sharing market does not produce at the social optimum, justifying the need for government intervention in the form of a subsidy for the provision of this good in order to internalize the positive externality. Many cities have adopted public-private partnerships to provide bike-shares, such as in Washington, D.C. with Capital Bikeshares. These partially government-funded programs may serve to better provide the good of bike-shares.

Dangers of over-supply 

Many bike-share companies and public-private partnerships aim to supply shared bicycles as a public good. In order for bike-shares to be a public good, they must be both non-excludable and non-rival. Numerous bike-share programs already offer their services partly for free or at least at very low prices, therefore nearing the non-excludable requirement. However, in order to achieve the non-rival requirement, shared bicycles must be supplied at a certain density within an urban area. There are numerous challenges with attaining non-rivalry, for instance, redistribution of bicycles from low-demand regions to regions with high-demand. Mobike, a China-based company, has addressed this problem by paying their users to ride their bikes from low-demand areas to high-demand areas. Citi Bike in New York City has a similar "Bike Angel" program to give discounts and prizes to balancers.

Other companies such as oBike have introduced a points system to penalize negative behavior, namely, illegal parking of shared bicycles. Economists speculate that a combination of efficient pricing with well-designed regulatory policies could significantly mitigate problems of over-supply and clutter.

The Chinese bicycle-sharing market demonstrated the danger of oversupply in 2018. Companies took advantage of unclear regulations in the preceding years to introduce millions of shared bikes to the country's cities. Users were not educated in how to use the systems properly and in many cases treated them as disposable, parking them anywhere. City governments were forced to impound the abandoned bikes when they blocked public thoroughfares, and millions of bikes went directly to junkyards after the companies that owned them went bankrupt.

Health impacts
A study published in the American Journal of Public Health reports observing an increase in cycling and health benefits where bicycle sharing systems are run. In the United States, bikesharing programs have proliferated in recent years, but collision and injury rates for bikesharing are lower than previously computed rates for personal bicycling; at least two people have been killed while using a bike share scheme.

There is also considerable evidence that bike-share programs must be adopted in tandem with city infrastructure, namely, the creation of bike lanes.  A 2012 study published in the American Journal of Public Health found that Toronto's cyclists were 30–50% more likely to be involved in an accident on major roads without cycle lanes than on those with.

Criticism 
Despite their theoretical and observed benefits, bike-share programs have come under attack as their presence has grown throughout the world. Much of this criticism has focused on the use of public funding – concerned critics posit that the use of tax money for bike-share programs should instead be diverted towards other services that more residents use on a daily basis. However, this argument relies on a faulty assumption that taxpayer money is a significant source of bike-share funding. An analysis by People for Bikes, an organization that advocates for new and safe bike infrastructure, found that public investment in Salt Lake City's Greenbike and Denver's B-Cycle programs was significantly less than traditional public transit (e.g. bus or rail) in those same cities, on a per-trip basis. Both Greenbike and B-Cycle's publicly funded subsidies amount to 10 percent or less of the total cost of one trip. In contrast, Salt Lake City's bus and rail system (UTA) relies on 80 percent public funding for a single trip.

Other critics claim that bike-share programs fail to reach more low-income communities. Some efforts have attempted to address this issue, such as New York City's Citi Bike's discounted membership program, which is aimed at increasing ridership among low-income residents. However, around 80 percent of study respondents reported that they had no knowledge of the program's discount.

A further criticism describes increasing discriminatory technical and organizational hurdles. In addition to registration and/or security deposits of addresses, money or bank card data, many systems require smartphones with certain operating systems and user accounts, usually by Apple or Google, or even a permanent or temporary mobile data connection for unlocking and returning the bicycles. Others offer the same functions via SMS, telephone, or a previously purchased chip card.

See also 

 Alternatives to the automobile
 Automobile dependency
 Bicycle cooperative
 List of bicycle-sharing systems
 Bike rental
 Carsharing and peer-to-peer carsharing
 Collaborative consumption
 Outline of cycling
 Scooter-sharing system
 Sustainable transport
 Public–private partnership
 Tandem bicycle

Notes

References

External links 
 

Sharing system
 
Articles containing video clips